Harry James Dawson was Dean of Niagara from 1986 until 1998.

Dawson was educated at  Bishop's University, Lennoxville and ordained in 1965. After a curacy in St. Catharines he held incumbencies at Acton and Guelph.

References 

Deans of Niagara
Bishop's University alumni
20th-century Canadian Anglican priests
Year of birth missing (living people)
Living people